The Fifty-sixth Oklahoma Legislature was the most recent meeting of the legislative branch of the government of Oklahoma, composed of the Senate and the House of Representatives. It met in Oklahoma City, Oklahoma from January 3, 2017, to January 3, 2019, during the final two years of the second administration of Governor Mary Fallin. The November 2016 elections maintained Republican control of both the House and Senate.

Dates of sessions
Organizational day: January 3, 2017
First session: February 2-May 22, 2017
First extraordinary session: September 25, 2017
Second extraordinary session: December 18, 2017
Second session: February 5-May 25, 2018
Previous: 55th Legislature • Next: 57th Legislature

Major legislation

2017 Legislative Session
Criminal Justice - SB603 mandates the Oklahoma Department of Corrections to create individualized case plans for each offender
Education - HB1693 revised Oklahoma's A-F school grading system to comply with federal law
Education - SB301 expands the Lindsey Nicole Henry Scholarship program
Public Health - HB1703 expands pregnancy resource centers
Public Health - HB2039 authorizes prescriptions of Naloxone to combat state's opioid crisis
Taxation - SB845 raises the state tax on cigarettes by $1.50 per pack to $2.53 per pack
Taxation - HB2433 raises the state tax on motor vehicle by extending a portion of state sales tax to include motor vehicle purchases 
Drivers License - HB1845 brings Oklahoma into compliance with the federal REAL ID Act
Drivers License - SB643 eliminates Oklahoma's administrative hearing procedure for revocation of drivers licenses
Crime and Punishment - HB1468 expands time limits for prosecution of sex crimes against children
Taxation - HB2298 eliminates tax credits for wind industry
Energy - SB867 expand ability for oil companies to conduct horizontal drilling
Tourism - SB872 transfer ownership of the American Indian Cultural Center and Museum from the state to the city of Oklahoma City
Taxation - SB120 extends tax credits for aerospace industry

2017 First Special Session
Pursuant to Section 7 of Article VI of the Oklahoma Constitution, the Governor recommended the Legislature adopt the following matters:
 Address the budget shortfall associated with the loss of revenue from the unconstitutionality of SB845
 Increase pay for public teachers
 Increase pay for public employees
 Provide supplemental funding for the Oklahoma State Department of Health

2017 Second Special Session
Following her veto of the amended fiscal year 2018 Oklahoma state budget, Governor Mary Fallin issued Executive Order 2017-43, later amended by subsequent order and again by an additional subsequent order, to convene a special meeting of the Oklahoma Legislature. Pursuant to Section 7 of Article VI of the Oklahoma Constitution, the Governor recommended the Legislature:
 Provided supplemental funding for the Oklahoma Health Care Authority 
 Adopt wide-ranging tax increases and elimination of tax deductions and credits
 Authorize expanded gambling by Native American tribes
 Grant the Governor greater appointment powers over Executive agencies
 Increase pay for public teachers

2018 Legislative Session

Subsequent Events
 On August 10, 2017, the Oklahoma Supreme Court, in the case of Naifeh v. Oklahoma ex rel Oklahoma Tax Commission, ruled 7-2 that SB845 violated the Oklahoma Constitution's tax raising clause by failing to obtain the super-majority of votes in the Legislature needed to raise taxes. SB845 had sought to raise the tax on cigarettes in an attempt to balance the fiscal year 2018 Oklahoma state budget. The Legislature had classified the measure as a "fee" as opposed to a "tax" but the Court disagreed with such classified. Without the revenues from the bill, the state budget lost over $200 million in anticipated revenue, forcing Governor Mary Fallin to convene an extraordinary session of the Legislature to revise the budget.
 On August 31, 2017, the Oklahoma Supreme Court, in the case of Oklahoma Automobile Dealers Association v. Oklahoma ex rel Oklahoma Tax Commission, ruled 5-4 that HB2433 did not violate the Oklahoma Constitution's tax raising clause. HB2433 eliminated an exemption under the current state sales tax code which excluded motor vehicle purchases from the tax. By removing the exemption, the Legislature did not raise a tax for the purposes of the Constitution's tax raising clause and therefore was not required to obtain the super-majority of votes in the Legislature needed to raise taxes.
 On December 19, 2017, the Oklahoma Supreme Court, in the case of Hunsucher v. Fallin, ruled 5-4 that SB643 unconstitutional under the Oklahoma Constitution's single-subject clause and Due Process Clause. SB643 eliminated Oklahoma's administrative hearings procedures for revocation of drivers licenses and allowed the Oklahoma Department of Public Safety to revoke the license without granting the affected driver a hearing before the Department or an administrative opportunity to object.

Leadership

Since the Republican Party holds the majority of seats in both the Oklahoma Senate and Oklahoma House of Representatives, they hold the top leadership positions in both chambers.

In Oklahoma, the lieutenant governor serves as President of the Oklahoma Senate, meaning that he serves as the presiding officer in ceremonial instances and can provide a tie-breaking vote. Todd Lamb serves as the current Lieutenant Governor of Oklahoma. The current President pro tempore of the Oklahoma Senate, who presides over the state senate on the majority of session days is Mike Schulz of Altus. He is aided by Majority Floor Leader Greg Treat of Oklahoma City. The Democratic minority leader of the state senate is John Sparks of Norman. Paul Ziriax serves as the Secretary of the Oklahoma Senate.

The Oklahoma House of Representatives is led by Speaker Charles McCall of Atoka. He is aided by Majority Floor Leader Jon Echols of Oklahoma City. The Democratic minority leader is Steve Kouplen of Beggs. Joel Kintsel serves as Chief Clerk of the Oklahoma House of Representatives.

Membership

Senate

Summary

Changes in Membership
March 27, 2017 Ralph Shortey (R) resigned from representing SD-44 after being charged with three felonies relating to soliciting prostitution from a male minor.
April 27, 2017 Kyle Loveless (R) resigns from representing SD-45 following a embezzlement investigation into his campaigns.  
July 11, 2017 Michael Brooks-Jimenez (D) takes office representing SD-44 filling the vacant seat left by Ralph Shortey's resignation. (Democratic gain)
September 12, 2017  Bryce Marlatt (R) resigned from representing SD-27 after being charged with felony sexual battery.
November 22, 2017 Paul Rosino (R) takes office representing SD-45 filling the vacant seat left by Kyle Loveless's resignation.
February 26, 2018 Casey Murdock (R) takes office representing SD-27 filing the vacant seat left by Bryce Marlatt's resignation.

Members

†Elected in a special election

House

Changes in membership
December 31, 2016- Tom Newell (R) resigned from representing HD-28 to accept a private sector job, leaving the seat vacant at the beginning of the session.
February 4, 2017- Dan Kirby (R) resigned from representing HD-75 after sexual assault allegations by his former legislative assistant came to light and the legislature scheduled a vote on his expulsion. Kirby's resignation before the vote prevented him from potentially becoming the first member of the state legislature ever to be expelled.
April 15, 2017- David Brumbaugh (R) died leaving HD-76's seat vacant.
May 31, 2017- Scott Martin (R) resigned from representing HD-46 to lead the Norman Chamber of Commerce.
July 20, 2017- Karen Gaddis (D) takes office representing HD-75 filling the vacancy left by Dan Kirby's resignation. (Democratic flip)
September 20, 2017-Jacob Rosecrants (D) takes office representing HD-46 filling the vacancy left by Scott Martin's resignation. (Democratic flip)
November 28, 2017- Ross Ford (R) takes office representing HD-76 filling the vacancy left by David Brumbaugh's death.
2017- Zack Taylor (R) takes office representing HD-28 filling the vacancy left by Tom Newell.
January 31, 2018- Dan Newberry (R) resigned from representing HD-37 in order to accept a position with Tulsa Teacher's Credit Union.

Members

References

External links
 Oklahoma Legislature Homepage
 State of Oklahoma's Website
 Legislative Bill Tracking Website

Oklahoma legislative sessions
2017 in Oklahoma
2018 in Oklahoma
2017 U.S. legislative sessions
2018 U.S. legislative sessions